Tisis mesozosta is a moth in the family Lecithoceridae. It is found in Taiwan and Anhui, Fujian, Jiangxi, Hainan and Yunnan provinces of China.

The wingspan is 19–21 mm. Adults are easily separable from other species of the genus Tisis by the characteristic marking on the forewings.

References

Moths described in 1914
Tisis
Taxa named by Edward Meyrick